The Dream is the seventh album from American Christian rock band Sanctus Real, released by Sparrow Records on October 14, 2014. Sanctus Real worked with producers Pete Kipley and Christopher Stevens in the creation of this album.

Reception

Indicating in a four star out of five review for AllMusic, David Jeffries mentioning, Sanctus Real are "Mellowing with age but as robust as ever, The Dream proves that Sanctus Real might very well be Christian rock's version of fine wine." Andy Argyrakis, agrees it is a four star album for CCM Magazine, declaring "Sanctus Real continues to shuffle up its established pop/rock sound with elements as diverse as dusty guitars, synthesizers and varied background vocals." Also in agreement is New Release Tuesday's Sarah Fine, with it being considered a four star release, declaring, "This is a solid release from one of Christian music's most established acts." Shaving a half star off his rating compared to the rest of the pack, John "Flip" Choquette realizing, "This album isn't perfect, but it's not bad either. It's not innovative, but it's not entirely generic either." Paul S. Ganney, in a seven out of ten review for Cross Rhythms, explaining, "Kicking off with the guitar-driven title track, then moving into electronica, this album gives you a good idea of the bases it'll cover right from the start: heavily echoed guitars, driving bass, wonderfully clear vocals." Awarding the album four and a half stars for Louder Than the Music, Jono Davies writes, "The songs have great lyrics and melodies and they just keep getting better with every listen." Amanda Brogan, rating the album a 4.4 out of five at Christian Music Review, says, "The Dream is classic Sanctus Real as you know and love them." Awarding the album an eight and a half star review for Jesus Wired, Rebekah Joys writes, "The album is full of inspirational, encouraging, and thought-provoking messages accompanied by upbeat and fun sounds to make it overall an album full of future hits." Christian St. John, rating the album five stars at Christian Review Magazine, states, Sanctus Real "have improved their music tenfold" on "a great album". Signaling in a four and a half star review from 365 Days of Inspiring Media, Joshua Andre replies, "Though the 11 track work of art [is] a masterpiece in its own right, [it] is sure to have its doubters... [because] ...they have taken the route of rock to CCM in a span of a few albums; as a pop/rock and CCM lover, this album is one of their best."

Track listing

Personnel 
Sanctus Real
 Matt Hammitt – vocals 
 Seth Huff – pianos, guitars 
 Chris Rohman – synthesizers, guitars
 Jake Rye – bass 
 Mark Graalman – drums 

Additional musicians
 Bryan Fowler – programming 
 Christopher Stevens – programming
 The Roy G. Biv String Vibe – strings

Production 
 Brad O'Donnell – A&R 
 Pete Kipley – producer, engineer 
 Christopher Stevens – producer (8, 11)
 Mike "X" O'Connor – engineer, editing 
 Bryan Fowler – assistant engineer 
 Jericho Scroggins – assistant engineer 
 Neal Avron – mixing 
 Sean Moffitt – mixing
 Mark Needham – mixing 
 Warren David – mix assistant 
 Ben O'Neill – mix assistant
 Scott Skrzynski – mix assistant
 Joe LaPorta – mastering 
 Sarah Sung – package design 
 Tyler Hays – logo design 
 Mark Anderson – photography 
 Jake Harsh – photography

Charts

References

2014 albums
Sanctus Real albums
Sparrow Records albums